A jukebox musical is a stage musical or musical film in which a majority of the songs are well-known popular music songs, rather than original music.

Some jukebox musicals use a wide variety of songs, while others confine themselves to songs performed by one singer or band, or written by one songwriter. In such cases, the plot is often a biography of the artist(s) in question. In other jukebox musicals, the plot is purely fictional. For musicals about a musician or musical act, some of the songs can be diegetic, meaning that they are performed within the world of the play or film. Works in which all of the music is diegetic, however, such as a biographical film about a singer who is at times shown performing their songs, are generally not considered jukebox musicals.

Revues that lack a plot are also usually not described as jukebox musicals, although plotless shows that include a dance element sometimes are.

History
In Europe in the 17th and 18th century, many comic operas were produced that parodied popular songs of the time by performing them with modified lyrics. Comédie en vaudevilles and ballad operas are two genres that made heavy use of well-known melodies. The Beggar's Opera (1728), the first ballad opera and the most famous, has been called "the original jukebox musical".

Films considered early examples of jukebox musicals include An American in Paris (1951), Singin' in the Rain (1952), Rock, Rock, Rock (1956) and Rock Around the Clock (1956).

The songwriting team of Robert Wright and George Forrest pioneered the concept of musicals whose songs are derived from one composer's instrumental works, with newly-written lyrics. Some of these musicals also told the life story of that composer. Musicals and operettas that they produced in this fashion include Song of Norway (1944, using the music of Edvard Grieg), Magdalena: a Musical Adventure (1948, music of Heitor Villa-Lobos), a 1949 reworking of the 1934 musical The Great Waltz (music of Johann Strauss I and Johann Strauss II), Kismet (1953, music of Alexander Borodin), and Anya (1965, music of Sergei Rachmaninoff).

The origin of the phrase "jukebox musical" in its current meaning is unclear. The word "jukebox" dates to around 1939. The first documented use of "jukebox musical" in print may have been in a 1962 description of the musical Do Re Mi, but that was a musical (with original music) about a man who sells jukeboxes. In a 1964 review of the Beatles film A Hard Day's Night, critic Andrew Sarris described that film as "the Citizen Kane of jukebox musicals", but he too may have had a meaning in mind other than the contemporary one, since most of that film's songs were original.

Although jukebox musicals had achieved success for years (for example, the 1989 musical Buddy: The Buddy Holly Story), a surge in popularity was led by the success of Mamma Mia! (1999), built around the music of ABBA.

Types of jukebox musicals
The most common format for jukebox musicals is a show that tells the life story of a famous musician or musical group, while incorporating songs from throughout their career. Artists whose life and songs have served as the basis for a jukebox musical include Peter Allen, Susan Boyle, Shlomo Carlebach, Johnny Cash, Cher, Patsy Cline, Bobby Darin, The Drifters, Emilio and Gloria Estefan, Buddy Holly, Michael Jackson (twice), Janis Joplin, Carole King, The Kinks, Fela Kuti, John Lennon, Udo Lindenberg, Bob Marley (twice), Johnny O'Keefe, The Seekers, Dusty Springfield (twice), Donna Summer, The Temptations, Tina Turner (twice), Frankie Valli and The Four Seasons, and Hank Williams. Others who have gotten similar treatment include songwriter/producers Bert Berns, Berry Gordy and Ellie Greenwich, record producer Florence Greenberg, and composer/songwriter Norbert Glanzberg.

For jukebox musicals with a fictional plot, one common approach is to center the plot around one or more (fictional) singers or musicians, thus letting some of the songs be performed as songs within the show. Examples of such musicals include Boogie Nights (1998), Mamma Mia! (1999), We Will Rock You (2002),  Hoy no me puedo levantar (2005), Bésame mucho, el musical (2005), Rock of Ages (2005),  Daddy Cool (2006), Never Forget (2007), Viva Forever! (2012), All Out of Love (2018), and Jukebox Hero (2018).

Some jukebox musicals are adaptations of a film, in which songs from the film's soundtrack are now sung by the characters; examples include Saturday Night Fever (1998), Priscilla, Queen of the Desert (2006), Cruel Intentions: The '90s Musical (2015) and the upcoming My Best Friend's Wedding.

Some shows and films combine original and previously-released songs; it may be a matter of opinion whether these qualify as jukebox musicals. For example, the stage musicals 42nd Street (1980), Five Guys Named Moe (1990), Crazy for You (1992), and Xanadu (2007) are all adaptations of earlier source material that added to the original score other well-known songs written by the original songwriters. The stage musicals The Last Ship (2014) and Standing at the Sky's Edge (2019) and film musicals Yellow Submarine (1968) and Idlewild (2006) are all musicals that combine original and previously-recorded songs by a single artist or group. Other films that combine old and original songs include Singin' in the Rain (1952), Trolls (2016), and Cinderella (2021).

List of stage jukebox musicals

1970s

1980s

1990s

2000s

2010s

2020s

List of jukebox musical films
Yankee Doodle Dandy (1942), a picture dealing with the life of playwright and composer George M. Cohan, and featuring many of his songs, which were among the most popular songs of their day (late 19th century – early 20th century).
Meet Me in St. Louis (1945), featuring mostly popular songs from the earlier 20th century and three new songs written for Judy Garland.
Till the Clouds Roll By (1946), a biopic of composer Jerome Kern, featuring his songs.
Easter Parade (1948), featuring a collection of songs by Irving Berlin.
One Sunday Afternoon (1948), featuring popular songs from the earlier 20th century.
 Painting the Clouds with Sunshine (1951), featuring popular songs from the 1910s to 1930s.
An American in Paris (1951), a fictionalized story based around George Gershwin's "An American in Paris" suite. The score consists entirely of George and Ira Gershwin pieces, with "American in Paris" being a recurring theme.
Singin' in the Rain (1952), featuring popular songs from the 1920s and '30s and songs by Arthur Freed, with the exception of two numbers ("Make 'Em Laugh" and "Moses Supposes")
The Band Wagon (1953) shared a title with The Band Wagon (musical), but only used three songs from the show. It featured an entirely new book by Betty Comden and Adolph Green, written to showcase the Howard Dietz–Arthur Schwartz songbook, including songs from Between the Devil, Flying Colors, and others. Only one song, "That's Entertainment!", was written for the film.
Love Me or Leave Me (1955), featuring popular songs from the 1930s.
Rock Around the Clock (1956), the first rock-and-roll movie musical, featuring the commercial recordings of Bill Haley and His Comets and The Platters.
Don't Knock the Rock (1957), another Bill Haley jukebox musical, with the commercial recordings of Haley, Little Richard, and The Treniers.
Hootenanny Hoot (1963), a low-budget MGM picture intended to capitalize on the folk music craze then sweeping America, featuring on-screen performances by Johnny Cash, Judy Henske, and several other folk music artists.
Yellow Submarine (1968), based on the songs of The Beatles.
Son of Dracula (1974), featuring songs from Harry Nilsson's albums Nilsson Schmilsson and Son of Schmilsson.
At Long Last Love (1975), based on the songs of Cole Porter.
All That Jazz (1979), featuring popular music from the earlier 20th century.
Can't Stop the Music (1980), featuring contemporary disco songs.
The Blues Brothers (1980), featuring various popular rhythm & blues songs.
American Pop (1981), featuring rock songs from the 1960s and '70s.
Everyone Says I Love You (1996), featuring popular music from the earlier 20th century.
Blues Brothers 2000 (1998), featuring various popular rhythm & blues songs.
Love's Labour's Lost (2000), featuring classic Broadway songs of the 1930s.
Moulin Rouge! (2001), featuring a variety of pop songs from various decades.
20 centímetros (2005), various artists, featuring a variety of pop songs from various decades.
Happy Feet (2006), featuring a variety of pop songs from various decades.
Idlewild (2006), featuring the songs of OutKast.
Romance & Cigarettes (2006), featuring mostly love themed pop-songs from the 1950s through '70s.
Across the Universe (2007), featuring the songs of The Beatles.
Stilyagi (2008), featuring Soviet rock songs from the 1970s and '80s.
Mamma Mia! (2008), based on the musical Mamma Mia!, which is based on the songs of ABBA.
 Gnomeo & Juliet (2011), based mostly on the music of Elton John.
 Happy Feet Two (2011), featuring a variety of pop songs from various decades.
 Toi, moi, les autres (2011), featuring a variety of French songs.
 Rock of Ages (2012), featuring hard rock and metal songs of the 1980s, and is based on the stage musical of the same name.
Lovestruck: The Musical (2013), featuring various pop and dance songs of the 1980s through present.
Sunshine on Leith (2013), based on the musical Sunshine on Leith, which is based on the songs of The Proclaimers.
Jersey Boys (2014), based on the musical Jersey Boys, which is based on the music of The Four Seasons.
Walking on Sunshine (2014), featuring pop songs from the 1980s.
Strange Magic (2015), featuring various genres and various artists.
Trolls (2016), featuring various genres and various artists.
Sing (2016), featuring various genres and various artists.
Mamma Mia! Here We Go Again (2018), sequel to the first film based on the musical Mamma Mia!, which is based on the songs of ABBA.
A Piece of My Heart (2019), based on the songs of Tomas Ledin.
Yesterday (2019), featuring songs of The Beatles.
Valley Girl (2020), featuring pop-songs from the 1980s.
My Heart Goes Boom! (2020), based on the songs of Raffaella Carrà.
Cinderella (2021), featuring various genres and various artists.
Voy a pasármelo bien (2022), featuring songs of Hombres G.
Greatest Days (TBC), based on the stage musical The Band, which is based on the songs of Take That.

List of jukebox musical TV shows
Kids Incorporated (1984-1994), featuring various genres and various artists.
Kidd Video (1984-1985), featuring various genres and various artists.
Lipstick on Your Collar (1993), featuring various artists from 1920 to 1960.
Blackpool (2004), featuring various genres and various artists.
Elvis (2005), based on the life and music of Elvis Presley.
Viva Laughlin (2007), featuring various genres and various artists.
Glee (2009-2015), featuring various genres and various artists.
The Kitchen Musical (2011), featuring a variety of Singaporean songs.
 Smash (2012-2013), which alternates between previously recorded material and original songs.
Beat Bugs (2016-2018), which uses different Beatles songs.
Motown Magic (2018-2019), which uses different Motown songs.
Soundtrack (2019-2020), featuring various genres and various artists.
Zoey's Extraordinary Playlist (2020-21), featuring various pop songs.

Works based on concept albums 
In a different category are films or stage musicals based around a concept album, in which the story being told is not original but rather a fleshed-out version of the narrative already contained in the album. Examples include:
 The 1974 musical Sgt. Pepper's Lonely Hearts Club Band on the Road, based on the 1967 album Sgt. Pepper's Lonely Hearts Club Band by The Beatles
 The 1975 film Tommy, based on the 1969 album Tommy by The Who
 The 1978 film Sgt. Pepper's Lonely Hearts Club Band, loosely based on Sgt. Pepper's Lonely Hearts Club Band on the Road, although it incorporates songs from some of the Beatles' other albums as well
 The 1982 film Pink Floyd – The Wall, based on the 1979 album The Wall by Pink Floyd
 The 1992 musical The Who's Tommy, also based on the album Tommy
 The 2010 musical American Idiot, based on the 2004 album American Idiot by Green Day

See also 
List of highest-grossing musicals
Soundtrack
Soundtrack album

References

External links
Mandelbaum, Ken. "Preview '05-'06: The Jukebox Plays On," July 27, 2005.
Jukebox musicals trend

Musical theatre
 
Film genres
Jukebox